Ivan Plum (born 6 May 1992 in Osijek) is a Croatian football striker, currently playing for HNK Mitnica Vukovar.

Club career
Plum started his career playing at youth level for Osijek. For his performances in the 2008–09 youth season (Kadeti), he was declared player of the year by Sportske novosti. He made his debut for the first team in the 2009–10 Prva HNL season against Croatia Sesvete on 20 March 2010, when he replaced Petar Stojkić for the final fifteen minutes of the match. Next season he also got the chance as a substitute, this time in a 3–0 away defeat against Cibalia. In January 2011, he was transferred to Dinamo Zagreb along with his brother Hrvoje in a package deal worth 300,000 €. Immediately after the transfer, Plum was loaned to Treća HNL side Radnik Sesvete and helped them reach promotion to Druga HNL. He was resent to Radnik Sesvete for the first part of the 2011/2012 season, but failed to leave a mark, which led to his contract being annulled. After a year at HNK Gorica at the same level, he returned to his lower-tier hometown club HNK Vukovar '91.

Career stats

Last updated on 24 October 2014

References

External links
 

Ivan Plum at Sportnet.hr 

1992 births
Living people
Footballers from Zagreb
Association football wingers
Croatian footballers
Croatia youth international footballers
NK Osijek players
NK Sesvete players
HNK Gorica players
HNK Vukovar '91 players
Croatian Football League players
First Football League (Croatia) players